Saifeddine Bouhra is a Moroccan professional footballer who plays as a midfielder.

Club career 
He is from the Moroccan Football Academy where Youssef En-Nesyri was training before transferring to Seville FC.

International career  
On July 28, 2022, he was summoned by coach Hicham Dmii for a training camp with the Morocco A' team , appearing on a list of 23 players who will take part in the Islamic Solidarity Games in August 2022.

References

2000 births
Living people
Moroccan footballers
Association football midfielders